Alan Caves (born 5 January 1966) is an English former professional darts player who played in Professional Darts Corporation (PDC) events.

Career
Caves' best run came at the 2004 UK Open where he reached the last 16, ultimately losing to Alan Warriner. At the 2007 PDC World Championship, Caves beat crowd favourite Wayne Mardle in the first round, eventually losing to two time semi-finalist Dave Askew in the second round.

World Championship results

PDC

 2005: Last 40 (lost to Josephus Schenk 0–3) (sets)
 2006: Last 64 (lost to Steve Alker 1–3)
 2007: Last 32 (lost to Dave Askew 2–4)

References

External links
Alan Caves – Profile and stats Darts Database

1966 births
Living people
English darts players
Professional Darts Corporation former pro tour players
PDC ranking title winners